= Ecphylus janzeni =

Scientific classification
- Kingdom: Animalia
- Phylum: Arthropoda
- Class: Insecta
- Order: Hymenoptera
- Family: Braconidae
- Genus: Ecphylus
- Species: E. janzeni

Binomial name
- Ecphylus janzeni Marsh, 2002

Species of braconid wasp

Ecphylus janzeni is a species of parasitic wasp belonging to the family Braconidae. This species is known for its role in the regulation of certain pest populations, contributing to natural pest control.

== Description ==
Ecphylus janzeni is a small braconid wasp characterized by its slender body, segmented antennae, and distinctive wing venation patterns. The species exhibits sexual dimorphism, with females typically being larger than males.

== Distribution, habitat and ecology ==
Ecphylus janzeni has been documented in various regions, primarily inhabiting tropical and subtropical environments. Specific locations include forested areas where host species are prevalent.

This wasp species is parasitic, targeting certain beetle larvae that infest wood or plant material. The female Ecphylus janzeni lays its eggs within the larvae of host species, where the developing wasp larvae consume the host from the inside out, eventually emerging as adult wasps.

== Importance in pest control ==
Ecphylus janzeni contributes to biological control by parasitizing pest beetle species, making it valuable in managing agricultural and forestry pests.
